Kroungrine is a studio album by English electronic music artist Bola. It was released in 2007 through Skam Records on both CD (SKALD022) and 2LP (SKALP022).

Track listing
 "Zoft Broiled Ed" - 5:03
 "Noop" - 4:28
 "Waknuts" - 5:32
 "Halyloola" - 4:54
 "Urenforpuren" - 6:08
 "Phulcra" - 5:51
 "Rainslaight" - 6:19
 "Diamortem" - 15:21

References

2007 albums